Angela Lonsdale ( Smith; 13 October 1967) is an English actress.

Biography
Born to a policeman father, Lonsdale trained at Brewery Youth Theatre at the Brewery Arts Centre, Kendal. She took part in a large number of amateur productions, including plays by local playwrights John Newman-Holden and Tim Bull. After initial rejection, Lonsdale then graduated from the Royal Scottish Academy of Music and Drama. Lonsdale is best known for playing police officer Emma Taylor on Coronation Street, later the wife of Curly Watts. Both characters left the programme in 2003.

She then took a regular part in the long-running television series The Bill. Lonsdale appeared as DI Eva Moore in the daytime BBC series Doctors. She left in October 2008, after her character was shot and presumed dead. She made a brief return to Doctors in September 2011. In 2012 and 2013 Lonsdale played the role of the mother in a family of wolves in children's TV drama Wolfblood.

Personal life
In 2005 Lonsdale married actor Perry Fenwick, who plays Billy Mitchell in EastEnders. They separated in 2010.

Filmography

References

External links

Alumni of the Royal Conservatoire of Scotland
English soap opera actresses
English television actresses
Living people
People from Penrith, Cumbria
1967 births